Dr. Mohamed Hassouna Fhema (d. 2008) served as Chairman of the Arab Scout Committee.

In 1983, he was awarded the 166th Bronze Wolf, the only distinction of the World Organization of the Scout Movement, awarded by the World Scout Committee for exceptional services to world Scouting.

References

External links
http://www.libya-watanona.com/letters/v2008a/v26may8p.htm
http://archive.libya-al-mostakbal.org/Special/dr_fheema_retha_280508.htm
http://www.scoutforum1.com/vb/showthread.php?t=2343

Recipients of the Bronze Wolf Award
Year of birth missing
Scouting and Guiding in Libya